The Banū Shabrīṭ, sometimes called the Banū al-Ṭawīl, were a prominent muwallad family in al-Andalus between the 8th and 10th centuries AD.

The family traced itself back to an indigenous Iberian Christian who converted to Islam not long after the invasion of 711. His name, Sh...h, given by al-ʿUdhrī, cannot be fully reconstructed and is clearly non-Arabic. The first prominent member of the family mentioned by al-ʿUdhrī is Shabrīṭ, active on either side of 800. By then they were one of the most powerful families in the Upper March. The seat of Banū Shabrīṭ power was in Huesca and Barbastro was also under their control. Although initially allied with the Umayyad emirs of Córdoba, by the 10th century they had carved out for themselves an effectively autonomous zone between the Umayyad and Carolingian powers. As a result, they sometimes pursued alliances with Pamplona and the Christian counties of the Pyrenees. They also used non-Arabic names, like Fortūn. The most prominent member of the family was Muḥammad al-Ṭawīl, whose nickname means "long" or "tall".

Family tree

Notes

Bibliography

Dynasties in al-Andalus
Upper March
Muwallads